Bhamian Khurd village is located in Ludhiana Tehsil of Ludhiana district in Punjab, India. It is situated 16 km away from sub-district headquarter Ludhiana (east) and 16 km away from district headquarter Ludhiana. As per 2009 stats, Shankar Colony is the gram panchayat of Bhamian Khurd village. It is situated 97 km from state capital Chandigarh.

Geographical Area 
The total geographical area of village is 216 hectares. Bhamian Khurd has a total population of 8,222 peoples. There are about 1,706 houses in Bhamian Khurd village. Ludhiana is nearest town to Bhamian Khurd.

Population of Bhamian Khurd

Connectivity of Bhamian Khurd

Nearby villages 
 Bhamian Kalan
 Mundian Kalan
 Mundian Khurd
 Sahabana
 Tajpur
 Kakka
 Dhoula
 Jamalpur
 Kuliawal
Ram Nagar
New Sunder Nagar
GTB Nagar
Jamalpur
Kunal Colony
Balaji Enclave

References

Villages in Ludhiana district